Russell S. "Pug" Daugherity (January 31, 1902 – March 1971) was a professional football player-coach in the National Football League (NFL) for the Frankford Yellow Jackets in 1927. Prior to his professional career, Daugherity played at college football, while attending the University of Illinois.

References

External links
 Ghosts of the Gridiron: The Frankford Yellow Jackets

1902 births
1971 deaths
American football fullbacks
American football halfbacks
Frankford Yellow Jackets coaches
Frankford Yellow Jackets players
Illinois Fighting Illini football players
Illinois Fighting Illini men's basketball players
People from Streator, Illinois
Players of American football from Illinois
People from Sierra Madre, California
American men's basketball players